Edward Righton may refer to:

Edward Righton senior (1884–1964), English cricketer
Edward Righton junior (1912–1986), English cricketer, son of the above
Edward Righton (actor) (1838–1899), English actor